Sapallanga District is one of twenty-eight districts of the province Huancayo in Peru.

See also 
 Apu Inka

References